Angelo Hays,  (born c. 1918, died January 12, 2008, Saint-Quentin-de-Chalais, France) was a French celebrity and inventor. Some sources, using the misspelled name Angelo, claim he survived a premature burial for two days.

Hays, a farm worker and inventor, said that on September 1, 1937, he fractured his skull in an accident, and he said he was "considered to be dead" and "was almost buried alive"
The incident led Hays to develop a coffin that could sustain human life, which he demonstrated at a fair in Saint-Aulaye, France in 1974, surviving 30 hours buried underground, and in 1984 survived two days buried at the "Festival des records et inventions" in Aubigny, France.

His invention led to several appearances on TV.

References

Year of birth uncertain
20th-century French inventors
Premature burials
2008 deaths